Rudolf Sprung (September 16, 1925 – March 18, 2015) was a German politician of the Christian Democratic Union (CDU) and former member of the German Bundestag.

Life 
Sprung fought between 1943 and 1945 as a soldier in World War II. The British captured him in the last days of the war and he was taken prisoner of war. After his release from captivity, he passed the Abitur in 1946 and then studied economics in Göttingen, graduating in 1949 with a degree in economics. He then worked as a research assistant at the University of Göttingen and received his PhD in 1952. Sprung joined then Friedrich Krupp in Essen as assistant director. But soon after in 1953 he joined the Federal Ministry of Finance in Bonn until 1958. He became a member of German delegation to European Economic Community and Euratom and was from 1959 to 1963 the deputy director at the European Investment Bank in Brussels.

In the 1960s he served as managing partner at Heinrich Hottenrott in Goslar.

Sprung had been a member of the CDU since 1960. For many years he was chairman of the CDU district association in Goslar and the CDU regional association in Braunschweig. From 1969 to 1994 Sprung was a member of the German Bundestag. Here he was deputy chairman of the Finance Committee from 1980 to 1982.

During his political career he reached the level of Parliamentary Secretary of State, Federal Ministry of Economics.

Literature

References

1925 births
2015 deaths
Members of the Bundestag for Lower Saxony
Members of the Bundestag 1990–1994
Members of the Bundestag 1987–1990
Members of the Bundestag 1983–1987
Members of the Bundestag 1980–1983
Members of the Bundestag 1976–1980
Members of the Bundestag 1972–1976
Members of the Bundestag 1969–1972
Members of the Bundestag for the Christian Democratic Union of Germany
Parliamentary State Secretaries of Germany
University of Göttingen alumni